MacGillivray Freeman Films is an American film studio based in Laguna Beach, California and founded in the mid-1960s by Greg MacGillivray and Jim Freeman. It produces documentaries, feature films, and IMAX films.

History
MacGillivray Freeman Films was established in 1963 in Laguna Beach, California by Greg MacGillivray and Jim Freeman. Greg MacGillivray began making films when he was 13 and later partnered with best friend Jim Freeman to form MacGillivray Freeman Films. In 1966, at the age of 19, the two dropped out of college to make movies full time starting with a film in South America after the success of one of their first surfing documentaries, Free and Easy, which recouped its production costs after only 10 screenings.

In the ensuing years, MacGillivray and Freeman produced a series of documentaries about surfing and skateboarding, pioneering a cinematic perspective for the genre by putting the viewer in the middle of the action via board-mounted cameras.

MacGillivray has produced and directed more than 50 films, over 35 of which are IMAX, and has developed three IMAX cameras: a high-speed (slow-motion) model, a lightweight model and the “all-weather” camera he used while filming on Mt. Everest.

Freeman died in a helicopter crash in 1976, two days before the release of To Fly!

Films

Documentaries and other films
Prior to producing IMAX films, the company produced surfing documentaries, TV commercials and filming for Hollywood feature films.

In 1976, it produced Magic Rolling Board, a 10-minute documentary about skateboarding. The company has directed and photographed for Warner Brothers, Twentieth Century Fox, Paramount and Stanley Kubrick. Cinematographer Jonathan Livingston Seagull was nominated for an Academy Award for Best Photography in 1974.The Towering Inferno received the Academy Award for Best Photography in 1975.

IMAX films
Most well known for its IMAX films, the studio has produced and distributed 35 IMAX films since 1974.  Its first IMAX film To Fly!, produced for the Smithsonian Institution National Air and Space Museum, was later selected by the Library of Congress for inclusion in the National Film Registry.

Two of its films, Dolphins (2000) and The Living Sea (1995), were nominated for Academy Awards. Its film Everest (1998) appeared Variety's Top 10 Box Office chart for North America.

The company's films have been received nominations and won awards from the Giant Screen Cinema Association (GSCA).

Filmography 
Below is a list of films and television commercials produced and/or distributed MacGillivray Freeman Films.

Conservation

MacGillivray Freeman Films Educational Foundation 
In 2004, Greg MacGillivray and his wife Barbara founded the non-profit MacGillivray Freeman Films Educational Foundation to contribute to the conservation of the world's natural and cultural heritage through giant screen films and companion educational programming.

One World One Ocean Campaign 
MacGillivray Freeman established the One World One Ocean campaign, which along with other organizations, was featured in Laguna Beach Eco Heroes, a 30-minute documentary by The My Hero Project. The efforts of the Crystal Cove Alliance, ECO Warrior, Laguna Bluebelt, Laguna Canyon Foundation, Nancy Caruso, Pacific Marine Mammal Center, Wyland, and Zero Trash Laguna were also highlighted in the documentary.

References

External links
MacGillivray Freeman Films official website
MacGillivray Freeman Films Educational Foundation official website
 Daily Variety - Greg MacGillivray: Peak performer

Film production companies of the United States